This is a list of Christian temples within the city limits of Sofia - the Bulgarian capital city. The city is the centre of the Sofia ecclesiastical district as well as a centre of the Sofia eparchy (diocese), part of The Bulgarian Orthodox Church.

Bulgarian Orthodox Churches

Other Christian Temples

See also 
Archbishopric of Sardica
Christianization of Bulgaria
Bulgarian Orthodox Church
Byzantine Revival architecture
List of largest church buildings
List of largest Eastern Orthodox church buildings
List of oldest church buildings
Ancient Roman architecture
Basilica
Rotunda (architecture)
Edict of Serdica
History of Sofia
Timeline of Sofia history
List of oldest buildings in Sofia

References
Temples in Sofia eparchy

External links

 Bulgarian Patriarchate

 
Sofia
Churches
Sofia